Ureta is a genus of African jumping spiders that was first described by Wanda Wesołowska & C. R. Haddad in 2013.  it contains two species, found in Africa: U. ghigii and U. quadrispinosa.

References

Salticidae genera
Salticidae
Spiders of South Africa
Taxa named by Wanda Wesołowska